Aslan are an Irish rock band from Dublin who formed in 1982. Composed of Christy Dignam, Joe Jewell, Billy McGuinness, and Alan Downey, the band has released six studio albums: Feel No Shame (1988), Goodbye Charlie Moonhead (1994), Here Comes Lucy Jones (1997), Waiting For This Madness To End (2001), For Some Strange Reason (2007) and Nudie Books and Frenchies (2012).

History 

Aslan took their name from the fictional lion in C.S. Lewis's series of books chronicling the land of Narnia (Aslan is the Turkish word for "Lion"). The band came from the working class areas of Finglas and Ballymun in Dublin's Northside, in the mid-1980s. They released a demo single, "This Is", in the spring of 1986. It was a success and a popular single on Ireland's pop radio station, RTÉ 2fm.

Career 

In the summer of 1986, they played a series of shows in the UK and Melody Maker noted: "Lucky the label that signs this band!" Janice Long at BBC Radio 1 recorded Aslan in session and it aired three times in the subsequent weeks. At the end of 1986, Aslan were awarded The Stag/Hot Press "Most Promising New Band" award and signed to EMI.

In 1988, they recorded their debut album, Feel No Shame, which went to number one on the Irish Albums Chart. Within a couple of months it was certified Gold. However, in August 1988 after the option for their second album had been picked up, Aslan split up. The band recruited Eamo Doyle previously with Dublin band The Lookalikes as lead singer, but as drummer Alan said on the Made In Dublin DVD that "it was like U2 trying to go on without Bono...it was just never going to work". Eamo Doyle went on to play with Les Binks from Judas Priest. The ex-lead singer, Christy, went on to form Dignam & Goff with guitarist Conor Goff and other members went on to form another band, The Precious Stones.

On 11 July 1993, Aslan played what was planned as a one-time charity performance in Finglas. Rather, they decided to reunite and Aslan landed a new record deal with BMG. The first single "Crazy World" entered the Irish Singles Chart at number four and stayed in the chart for three months. "Crazy World" also won the "Single of the Year" at 1993's Hot Press Awards. A few months later the follow-up single, "Where's The Sun", reached number three on the chart.

The latter part of 1994 was spent touring in Ireland and recording their album Goodbye Charlie Moonhead, which was released in Ireland at the end of 1994 and charted at number one, going on to be certified Gold weeks later. But by 1995, the band were dropped by their record label BMG.

In April 1996, Aslan began recording a new album without a record label.  This album, Here Comes Lucy Jones was released in October 1997 and the album went into the Irish Albums Chart at number fourteen. Aslan were nominated in seven categories of the 1997 Hot Press readers poll.

Shame About Lucy Moonhead, a compilation of the best of Aslan's recorded work on EMI, was released in July 1998. It reached number one in the albums chart and was later certified double platinum.

In March 1999, Aslan played five sell-out shows at Ireland's Vicar Street venue, during which their live album and video concert movie/DVD Made In Dublin were recorded. Both reached number one in their first week of release. The album went platinum within three weeks and remained in the top ten for eight weeks. Towards the end of 1999 Aslan sold out Ireland's largest indoor venue (9,000 capacity), the Point Theatre on 26 December, sharing the billing with Picture House.

In the summer of 2000, Aslan toured Australia for the first time to promote the release of the album Shame About Lucy Moonhead and sold-out shows in Sydney and Melbourne. Aslan ended 2000 by playing for the first time in the Netherlands to a sellout crowd. Afterwards, they returned to Ireland to sell out the Point Theatre on 27 December.

In early 2001, Aslan recorded a single, "She's So Beautiful" (featuring Sinéad O'Connor on backing vocals), which entered the Irish Singles Chart at number nine on the week ending 26 July 2001 and peaked at number eight the following week. The band released the follow-up "Different Man", which charted at number seven. In September 2001, Aslan's studio album, Waiting for This Madness to End entered the Irish Album Chart at number one, and reached platinum sales certification after only four weeks. During Christmas 2001, Aslan again sold out the 9,000 capacity Point Theatre. In 2002 Aslan were nominated for eight categories in the Hot Press readers' poll.

In October 2005, the band released a 48-track CD, named Platinum. The album contains the singles, b-sides and rarities of their career. The Platinum collection went into the charts at number three and after several weeks achieved platinum sales. The band played yet another headlining gig at the Point Theatre on 27 December 2005.

The band helped write and perform "How Can I Protect You", the tenth track for Alabama 3 on their 2006 album, Outlaw. Their next album, For Some Strange Reason, was released in October 2007 and debuted at number eight in the Irish Albums Chart. This was their first album based solely on new material not to debut in top spot since 1997's Here Comes Lucy Jones. Two singles, "Here Comes the Sun" and "Jealous Little Thing" were released prior to the album. Singer Damien Dempsey makes an appearance on the new album on the track "Bullets and Diamonds".

On 15 February 2008, Aslan won the award for Best Irish Band at the 2008 Meteor Awards. Soon afterwards, Tony McGuinness announced on the band's website that he would be moving to Australia for one year with his family, and would be replaced by Rodney O'Brien as bass player for Aslan during that time. On 7 November 2008, Aslan performed "Always" on a Balcony overlooking Dame Street, in Dublin for the music viral show BalconyTV.

In May 2009, Aslan released "Uncased" and reached number two in the Irish Singles Chart. The band toured Australia in December 2011 playing to large crowds of predominantly expatriates.
Their album Nudie Books and Frenchies was released in April 2012 and reached number one in the Irish Albums Chart.

Aslan released their next single "Secret Smile" on 10 July 2015. They also released their single "Now I Know" in 2018, with a 30th anniversary version of Feel No Shame on vinyl and CD. In early 2019, they released a 25th anniversary edition of Goodbye Charlie Moonhead on vinyl, excluding the track "Maybe I’m Obsessed".

Band members
Current
 Christy Dignam – lead vocals (1982-1987, 1993–present)
 Joe Jewell – lead guitar, backing vocals (1982-1988, 1993–present)
 Billy McGuinness – keyboards, harmonica, guitar (1982-1988, 1993–present)
 Alan Downey – drums, percussion (1982-1988, 1993–present)

Former
 Tony McGuinness – bass guitar (1982–2008)
 Rodney O'Brien (2009-2022) -bass 
 Eamonn 'Eamo' Doyle – lead vocals (1988-1989)

Discography

Studio albums

Live albums

Compilation albums

Singles

DVD
 Made In Dublin - Unplugged and Documented (1999)
 “Please Don’t Stop” (2013)

Bibliography
 Damien Corless: Aslan's crazy world, Verge-Brunswick Press, 1998.

References

External links

 Official website
 Aslan at the Irish Music Database
 Aslan News - UK based news site run by Dave and Savo
 AUDIO NETWORKS: Aslan's Booking Agent
 Aslan MySpace - For all the latest news, gigs and info
 - Official Bebo

EMI Records artists
Irish rock music groups
Musical groups established in 1982
Musical groups from Dublin (city)
1982 establishments in Ireland
Sony BMG artists